Neal is an unincorporated community in Pike County, in the U.S. state of Georgia.

History
Neal was originally named Williamsville; the present name, after landowner H. B. Neal, was adopted when the railroad was extended to the area.  A post office called Neal was established in 1886, and remained in operation until 1929.

References

Unincorporated communities in Pike County, Georgia